Hathor 15 - Coptic Calendar - Hathor 17

The sixteenth day of the Coptic month of Hathor, the third month of the Coptic year. On a common year, this day corresponds to November 12, of the Julian Calendar, and November 25, of the Gregorian Calendar. This day falls in the Coptic season of Peret, the season of emergence. This is the first day of the Nativity Fast.

Commemorations

Saints 

 The martyrdom of Saint Justus, the Bishop 
 The departure of Pope Mina II, the sixty-second Patriarch of the See of Saint Mark 
 The departure of Saint Nilus of Sinai

Other commemorations 

 The beginning of the Fast of the Nativity
 The consecration of the Church of Saint Onuphrius the Hermit

References 

Days of the Coptic calendar